Janův Důl is a municipality and village in Liberec District in the Liberec Region of the Czech Republic. It has about 200 inhabitants.

History
Janův Důl was founded in 1569.

References

External links

Villages in Liberec District